The Dark Road is a 1917 American silent drama film directed by Charles Miller and starring Dorothy Dalton, Robert McKim and John Gilbert. The film's sets were designed by the art director Robert Brunton.

It is set in England during World War I, where the adulterous wife of a British army officer becomes entangled with a German spy.

Cast
 Dorothy Dalton as Cleo Morrison
 Robert McKim as Carlos Costa
 Jack Livingston as Capt. James Morrison
 John Gilbert as Cedric Constable
 Walt Whitman as Sir John Constable
 Lydia Knott as Lady Mary Constable

References

Bibliography
 Robert B. Connelly. The Silents: Silent Feature Films, 1910-36, Volume 40, Issue 2. December Press, 1998.

External links
 

1917 films
1917 drama films
1910s English-language films
American silent feature films
American spy drama films
American black-and-white films
Triangle Film Corporation films
Films directed by Charles Miller
Films set in England
1910s spy drama films
1910s American films
Silent American drama films